Jason Eric Bargwanna (born 26 April, 1971) is an Australian motor racing driver. Best known as a Supercars Championship competitor, Bargwanna raced in the series for 25 years, the pinnacle of which was winning, with Garth Tander, the 2000 Bathurst 1000 in a Garry Rogers Motorsport prepared Holden Commodore. Bargwanna was the Driving Standards Observer for the Supercars Championship from 2014 until 2016.

Career history
Bargwanna commenced his racing career in the late 1980s, initially competing in the Formula Vee category. He made his Bathurst 1000 début while still a teenager in 1990 and won the 1992 Bathurst 1600 cc class at 20, with his cousin Scott, however a lack of funding limited his motor sport participation for the next few seasons and he pursued a career in the financial sector.

His career finally started to move forward in 1995, racing in the Australian Formula Ford Championship. He impressed in his seven-year-old Reynard, racing against younger drivers with the latest cars from Van Diemen and Swift and against drivers of the caliber of Jason Bright and Mark Webber. His 1995 showing allowed him to attract the budget to run a campaign with late model equipment in 1996 and he finished second in the championship to Van Diemen's factory supported driver, David Besnard. He also represented Australia in the EFDA Nations Cup in both 1995 and 1996. A move to Formula Holden resulted in second place in the 1997 Australian Drivers' Championship with SH Racing.

V8 Supercars
As a member of the Holden Young Lions V8 Supercar program in 1997, he surprised many by taking provisional pole position in the #97 Holden Commodore at the Bathurst 1000 Classic only to damage the car beyond repair in a race day warm up accident. His career further advanced in 1998 with a move full-time to Garry Rogers Motorsport, where he stayed for five years. Bargwanna is best known for winning the 2000 Bathurst 1000 with Garth Tander for that team. He also scored two round wins at the Winton event in 1999 and 2000 and at the inaugural championship round supporting the Gold Coast Indy 300, the V8 Supercar Challenge, in 2002.

In 2003, Bargwanna switched to Ford and drove for Larkham Motor Sport from 2003 to 2005. In 2006, Larkham Motor Sport merged with WPS Racing, the team folding immediately prior to the 2008 season and leaving Bargwanna without a full-time drive. He did however co-drove a Holden Commodore (VE) for Rod Nash Racing alongside Tony D'Alberto in the 2008 Phillip Island 500 and the Bathurst 1000 endurance races.

Bargwanna joined Tasman Motorsport for 2009 and, following the closure of that team at the end of the season, he joined Kelly Racing for 2010. He was also voted in the top 50 all time Australian Touring car drivers in 2010.
In 2011 Bargwanna drove a Brad Jones Racing Commodore alongside his junior open-wheel rival, Jason Bright.

In 2014, Bargwanna was appointed as the Driver Standards Observer for the Supercars Championship. Bargwanna left the post at the end of 2016.

New Zealand V8 
In late 2011, Bargwanna left the V8 Supercars Australia and joined the New Zealand V8. He resulted runner-up in the 2011/12 season behind Angus Fogg, collecting a round win and podiums in the six rounds driving a Tulloch Ford Falcon. The team switched to a Holden Commodore for the 2013 season. The driver won nine out of 15 races and got the TLX title.

TCR
In 2020, Bargwanna was to make his debut in the TCR Australia and TCR Asia Pacific Cup driving a Peugeot 308. Both series were cancelled due to the Corona Virus Pandemic. In 2021, he and his son Ben, debuted in the series. Jason scored his first win at Phillip Island

Personal life
Bargwanna is married to Debra and has two children, Jake and Ben. He lives in Nar Nar Goon, Victoria. His father, Harry Bargwanna, himself an Australian racing driver, owns and operates a mechanical repair shop in the Southern Sydney suburb of Engadine. His uncle Alf and cousin Scott are also national level race drivers. Bargwanna attended Heathcote High School in Sydney. Bargwanna owns four Red Rooster franchises in Hampton Park, Fountain Gate, Hastings, and Pakenham West.

Career results

† team result

Complete Bathurst 1000 results

Complete Bathurst 12 Hour results

TCR Australia results 
(Races in bold indicate pole position) (Races in italics indicate fastest lap)

References

External links

Driver DataBase profile
Racing Reference profile
News articles, pictures & videos on Motorsport.com
News Articles on Speedcafe.com

1972 births
Supercars Championship drivers
Formula Ford drivers
Formula Holden drivers
EFDA Nations Cup drivers
Sportsmen from New South Wales
Living people
Bathurst 1000 winners
Toyota Racing Series drivers
Australian Touring Car Championship drivers
Racing drivers from Sydney
Australian Endurance Championship drivers
Garry Rogers Motorsport drivers
Kelly Racing drivers